Hradyesh is an automobile manufacturing company based in India, specialising in custom made luxury cars.

Their "masterpiece edition" car Morris Street was launched in 2011. The company claimed that it was the most expensive luxury car built by an Indian car company.

References

Manufacturing companies based in Delhi
Companies based in New Delhi
Vehicle manufacturing companies established in 2011
Luxury motor vehicle manufacturers
Car manufacturers of India
Indian brands
Luxury brands
2011 establishments in Delhi
Indian companies established in 2011